The 29th Military Airlift Squadron is an inactive United States Air Force unit.  Its last was assigned to the 438th Military Airlift Wing, Military Airlift Command, stationed at McGuire Air Force Base, New Jersey.  It was inactivated on 31 August 1968.

History

Lineage
 Constituted as 29th Ferrying Squadron, on 9 Jul 1942
 Activated on 25 Jul 1942
 Redesignated: 29th Transport Squadron, on 24 Mar 1943
 Disbanded on 1 Sep 1943
 Reconstituted, redesignated and activated: 29th Air Transport Squadron, Heavy, 20 Jun 1952
 Redesignated: 29th Air Transport Squadron, Medium on  11 Sep 1953
 Redesignated: 29th Military Airlift Squadron on  8 January 1966
 Discontinued & inactivated on 31 August 1968

Assignments
 8th Ferrying (later Transport) Group, 25 Jul 1942-1 Sep 1943
 1600th Air Transport Group, 20 Jul 1952-13 Apr 1955
 1611th Air Transport Group, 13 Apr 1955-18 Jan 1963
 1611th Air Transport Wing, 18 Jan 1953-8 Jan 1966
 438th Military Airlift Wing, 8 Jan 1966-31 Aug 1968

Stations
 Presque Isle Army Air Field, Maine, 25 Jul 1942-1 Sep 1943
 Westover AFB, Massachusetts, 20 Jul 1952-13 Apr 1955
 McGuire AFB, New Jersey, 13 Apr 1955-31 Aug 1968

Aircraft
 C-97, 1952–1953
 C-54, 1953–1954
 C-118, 1954–1964
 C-130, 1964–1968

References

 Mueller, Robert, Air Force Bases Volume I, Active Air Force Bases Within the United States of America on 17 September 1982, Office of Air Force History, 1989

029
Military units and formations in New Jersey